The 2000 Toronto municipal election, dubbed "Toronto Vote 2000", was the municipal and school board election of 2000 held in Toronto on November 13, 2000.

Elections were held to elect:
 the Mayor of Toronto,
 councillors for each of Toronto's 44 wards,
 trustees for each of the Toronto District School Board's 22 sections (each comprising two city wards),
 trustees for each of the Toronto Catholic District School Board's 12 sections (each comprising two to six city wards),
 trustees for the three sections of the Conseil scolaire de district du Centre-Sud-Ouest (French-language public school board) located in Toronto, and
 trustees for the two sections of the Conseil scolaire de district catholique Centre-Sud (French-language Catholic school board) located in Toronto.

Mayoralty election

Results

City council

The city council elections were eventful.  Redistricting increased the number of wards from 28 to 44, but each ward only elected a single councillor, reducing the number of councillors from 56 to 44. This created several battles between incumbents such as Gloria Lindsay Luby against Mario Giansante, David Miller versus Bill Saundercook, and Milton Berger against Anne Johnston.  For the most part, incumbents were re-elected: the major exception was Etobicoke where three incumbents -- Blake Kinahan, Elizabeth Brown, and Bruce Sinclair —were defeated.  Over all, the elections shifted the council somewhat to the left.

Ward 1 - Etobicoke North:

Suzan Hall 2,894
Vincent Crisanti 2,797
Manjinder Singh 2,471
(incumbent) Bruce Sinclair 1,907
Anthony Caputo	978
Murphy Browne 364
Courtney Doldron 134
Alan Nemaric 64
Albin Janus 59

Ward 2 - Etobicoke North:

Rob Ford 5,750
(incumbent) Elizabeth Brown 4,122
Nicolò Fortunato	1,747
Mahdi Abdurahman	766
Joseph Martino	598
Arnold Minors	295

Ward 3 - Etobicoke Centre:

(incumbent) Doug Holyday 12,639
Nicholas Florio 2,491

Ward 4 - Etobicoke Centre:

(incumbent) Gloria Lindsay Luby 9,295
(incumbent) Mario Giansante 8,138
John Sumka	481

Ward 5 - Etobicoke—Lakeshore: 
Peter Milczyn 6,970
(incumbent) Blake Kinahan 6,640
Brian Flynn 3,193

Ward 6 - Etobicoke—Lakeshore: 
(incumbent) Irene Jones 10,442
David Rifat	1,617
George Kash	1,373

Ward 7 - York West:
(incumbent) George Mammoliti 9,123
Satpal Banga 3,189

Ward 9 - York Centre:
(incumbent) Maria Augimeri 8,698
Mary Cicogna 2,816
Frank Aceto	504

Ward 10 - York Centre:
(incumbent) Mike Feldman 12,221
Daniel Radin	2,687

Ward 11 - York South—Weston: 
(incumbent) Frances Nunziata 10,493
Mike Washuck 1,828

Ward 12 - York South—Weston: 
Frank Di Giorgio 4,061
Lorenzo Zeppieri 2,719
Mario Gentile 2,567
Sal Piccininni	1,835
Paul Taylor 1,035

Ward 14 - Parkdale-High Park:
(incumbent) Chris Korwin-Kuczynski 7,488
John Colautti 4,012
Victor Watson	724
Jorge Van Schouwen	416

Ward 16 - Eglinton—Lawrence:
(incumbent) Anne Johnston 8,012
(incumbent) Milton Berger 4,148
Albert Pantaleo 2,101
David Lipton	572

Ward 17 - Davenport:
(incumbent) Betty Disero	8,711
Romolo Cimaroli 1,743

Ward 18 - Davenport:
(incumbent) Mario Silva 6,037
Adam Giambrone 3,338
Janice Cudlip	319
Richard Kankis	206

Ward 19 - Trinity—Spadina:
(incumbent) Joe Pantalone 9,971
Philip Vettese	1,098

Ward 20 - Trinity—Spadina:
(incumbent) Olivia Chow 9,477
Rosie Schwartz	1,140
Roberto Verdecchia	1,126

Ward 21 - St. Paul's:
(incumbent) Joe Mihevc 9,636
(incumbent) Rob Davis 5,989
Chai Kalevar 311

Ward 22 - St. Paul's:
(incumbent) Michael Walker 11,542
Jim Walker 4,822

Ward 23 - Willowdale:
(incumbent) John Filion 10,213
Ron Summers 5,395
Youval Zilberberg 813

Ward 24 - Willowdale:
(incumbent) David Shiner 11,673
Bernadette Michael 2,481

Ward 25 - Don Valley West:
(incumbent) Joanne Flint 11,124
John Cameron 2,891

Ward 26 - Don Valley West:
(incumbent) Jane Pitfield 11,058
Don Yuill 3,421
Muhammad Bajwa	1,162

Ward 27 - Toronto Centre—Rosedale:
(incumbent) Kyle Rae acclaimed

Ward 28 - Toronto Centre—Rosedale:
(incumbent) Pam McConnell 7,573
Jennifer Daly 1,630
Wendy Forrest	1,038
Mike Armstrong	1,027
Nichola Marshall 748
James Sturdy 415
Aaron Hume 363

Ward 29 - Broadview—Greenwood:
Case Ootes 7,660
Gail Nyberg 4,391
Bob Dale 1,963
Nick Radia 276

Ward 30 - Broadview—Greenwood:
(incumbent) Jack Layton 8,671
Linda Lynch 3,750
Ty Daniels 817
Jeff Layton 627
Ghuffar Rabbani 523
Joseph Norte 126

Ward 31 - Beaches—East York:
(incumbent) Michael Prue 10,435
Paul Fernandes 3,183
John Simmons 555

Ward 32 - Beaches—East York:
(incumbent) Sandra Bussin 10,766
David Moll 5,530
Paul Azzarello	419
Bruce Bryer 388
Jeffery Dorman	309

Ward 33 - Don Valley East:
Paul Sutherland 9,860
Daniel Georgescu 1,004
Thomas Lynch 996
Robert Ladanyi	458

Ward 34 - Don Valley East:
Denzil Minnan-Wong 8,730
Kim Scott 5,078
Neil Milson 599

Ward 35 - Scarborough Southwest:
(incumbent) Gerry Altobello 7,118
Worrick Russell 3,290
Tao Gold 566

Ward 36 - Scarborough Southwest:
(incumbent) Brian Ashton 9,374
Robert Scott 3,682

Ward 37 - Scarborough Centre:
(incumbent) Lorenzo Berardinetti 11,007
Colleen Mills 3,203

Ward 38 - Scarborough Centre:
Brad Duguid 11,369
Angela Bischoff 1,693

Ward 39 - Scarborough—Agincourt:
(incumbent) Sherene Shaw 8,474
Simon Kwan	1,531
Sunshine Smith	1,069

Ward 40 - Scarborough—Agincourt:
(incumbent) Norm Kelly	8,115
(incumbent) Mike Tzekas 4,322
Manna Wong 2,108
Winston Ramjeet 323

Ward 41 - Scarborough—Rouge River:
(incumbent) Bas Balkissoon 9,141
Mike Thomas 4,714

Ward 42 - Scarborough—Rouge River:
(incumbent) Raymond Cho 7,428	
Eden Gajraj 2,101	
Horace Dockery	1,890	
Pat Johnson	562	

Ward 43 - Scarborough East:
(incumbent) David Soknacki acclaimed

Ward 44 - Scarborough East:
(incumbent) Ron Moeser 9,897
Sheila White 3,568
Jeff Phillips 1,530

2000
2000 Ontario municipal elections
2000 in Toronto